Triplophysa angeli is a species of stone loach in the genus Triplophysa. It is endemic to the Yalong River in Sichuan, China. It grows to  SL.

Etymology
The specific name honours the herpetologist Fernand Angel (1881–1950) of the Muséum national d’Histoire naturelle in Paris, "who was “always interested” (translation) in Fang's work".

References

A
Freshwater fish of China
Endemic fauna of Sichuan
Taxa named by Fang Ping-Wen
Fish described in 1941